Indoennea is a genus of air-breathing land snails, terrestrial pulmonate gastropod mollusks in the family Streptaxidae.

Distribution 
The distribution of the genus Indoennea includes:
 India
 Malaya
 Sumatra, Indonesia
 Hateruma Island, Ryukyu Islands, Japan

Species
Species within the genus Indoennea include:
 Indoennea bicolor (Hutton, 1834)

References

Streptaxidae